Khadamabad-e Mokhtar (also Romanized as Khādamābād-e Mokhtār; also known as Khādamābād) is a village in Sarrud-e Jonubi Rural District, in the Central District of Boyer-Ahmad County, Kohgiluyeh and Boyer-Ahmad Province, Iran. At the 2006 census, its population was 46, in 10 families.

References 

Populated places in Boyer-Ahmad County